Clematis florida, the Asian virginsbower, or passion flower clematis, is a species of flowering plant in the family Ranunculaceae. It is native to southern China, and has been introduced to Korea and Japan. There are a number of cultivars commercially available, including 'Sieboldiana',  'Evirida', and 'Plena'.

References

florida
Garden plants of Asia
Endemic flora of China
Flora of South-Central China
Flora of Southeast China
Plants described in 1784